Attard Football Club is a Maltese football club from the small village of Attard in central Malta. They currently play in the Maltese Challenge League. The club was founded in 1974 and wears a red and black striped kit. The club are nicknamed Seracini.

History

Season 2019–20 
In the 2019–20 season, Attard as usual started the campaign as title contenders for the Maltese Third Division mainly with their additions to the squad including prolific striker Nicholas Schembri from Swieqi United. From the start of the season, Attard were always dominant on top of the table and ultimately ended as Champions as the season ended before due to the COVID-19 pandemic. Undoubtedly, Nicholas Schembri finished the season as the Top Scorer of the league with a total of 19 goals.

On the 4 July 2020 Attard were crowned with the Third Division Trophy at the Attard F.C premises from the MFA president Mr.Bjorn Vassallo.

Under 19 
In the same season, the Attard F.C. Under 19 squad gathered a remarkable promotion to the Youths League Section B as Champions and thus continuing on the Senior Team success. 

On the 8 July, a delegate of the Under 19 squad received the Trophy at the MFA premises in Ta'Qali.

Season 2021-2022 

During the 2021/2022 season, Attard were declared champions and promoted to the BOV Challenge League for the following season. In fact, they finished the season undefeated.

Honours
 BOV Third Division: 2019–20

References

External links 
 Profile on Malta Football Association's website

Football clubs in Malta
Association football clubs established in 1974
1974 establishments in Malta
Attard